Dutch Pakistanis formed a population of 27,261 individuals (persons born in Pakistan or with at least one parent born there) according to the latest official statistics published by the Netherlands Centraal Bureau voor de Statistiek on 1 January 2022.

Notable people
 Imran Khan - singer and musician
 Kamal Raja - singer and musician
 F1rstman - rapper and beatboxer
 Rahil Ahmed - cricketer
 Mudassar Bukhari - cricketer
 Mohammad Kashif - cricketer
 Asim Khan - cricketer
 Adeel Raja - cricketer
 Madiea Ghafoor - athlete and Olympian

See also 
 Netherlands–Pakistan relations
 Pakistani Americans
 Pakistani Canadians
 Pakistanis in Ireland
 Pakistanis in the United Kingdom
 Pakistanis in France
 Pakistanis in Belgium
 Pakistanis in Germany
 Pakistanis in Switzerland
 Pakistanis in Italy
 Pakistanis in Denmark
 Pakistanis in Norway
 Pakistanis in Sweden
 Pakistani Australians
 Pakistani New Zealanders

References

Further reading

 
Muslim communities in Europe
Netherlands